Moses Dunning Stivers (December 30, 1828 – February 2, 1895) was an American businessman and politician who served one term as a U.S. Representative from New York from 1889 to 1891.

Biography 
Born in Beemerville, Wantage Township, New Jersey, Stivers attended common and private schools and Mount Retirement Seminary in Wantage.
He moved with his father to Ridgebury, New York, in 1845 and completed his education.
He taught school.

Career 
He engaged in mercantile pursuits in Ridgebury and later in Middletown from 1855 to 1864.
He served as clerk of Orange County 1864-1867 and resided in Goshen, New York.

He returned to Middletown and became proprietor of the Orange County Press in 1868 and was also one of the proprietors and editors of the Middletown Daily Press.
He was appointed by President Grant as United States collector of internal revenue for the eleventh district of New York in 1869 and served until 1883.
He served as delegate to the Republican National Convention in 1880.
He engaged in banking.

Congress 
He was an unsuccessful Republican candidate for election in 1884 to the Forty-ninth Congress to fill the vacancy caused by the death of Lewis Beach and for election in 1886 to the Fiftieth Congress.

Stivers was elected as a Republican to the Fifty-first Congress (March 4, 1889 – March 3, 1891).
He was not a candidate for renomination in 1890.

Later career and death 
He then engaged in banking.

He died in Middletown, New York, February 2, 1895.
He was interred in Hillside Cemetery.

Family 
State Senator John D. Stivers (1861–1935) was his son.

Sources

1828 births
1895 deaths
Politicians from Orange County, New York
Republican Party members of the United States House of Representatives from New York (state)
People from Sussex County, New Jersey
People from Middletown, Orange County, New York
People from Goshen, New York
People from Orange County, New York
19th-century American politicians